The Marquess of Queensberry Rules, also known as Queensbury Rules, are a code of generally accepted rules in the sport of boxing. Drafted in London in 1865 and published in 1867, they were named so as the 9th Marquess of Queensberry publicly endorsed the code, although they were written by a Welsh sportsman named John Graham Chambers from Llanelli, Carmarthenshire. The code of rules on which modern boxing is based, the Queensberry rules were the first to mandate the use of gloves in boxing.

The Queensberry Rules eventually superseded the London Prize Ring Rules (revised in 1853), and are intended for use in both professional and amateur boxing matches, thus separating it from the less-popular American Fair Play Rules, which were strictly intended for amateur matches. In colloquial use the term is sometimes used to refer to a sense of sportsmanship and fair play.

History
The boxing code was written by John Graham Chambers, a Welshman from Llanelli, Carmarthenshire, and drafted in London in 1865, before being published in 1867 as "the Queensberry rules for the sport of boxing". At the time, boxing matches were conducted under the London Prize Ring Rules, written in 1838 and revised in 1853. Bare-knuckle fights under the London Prize Rules continued for the next several decades, although the Queensberry Rules would eventually become the standard set of rules under which all boxing matches were governed. This version persuaded boxers that "you must not fight simply to win; no holds barred is not the way; you must win by the rules".

One early prize fighter who fought under Marquess of Queensberry rules was Jem Mace, former English heavyweight champion, who defeated Bill Davis in Virginia City, Nevada under these rules in 1876. In 1889, the Queensberry rules came into use in the United States and Canada.

Rules
 To be a fair stand-up boxing match in a 24-foot ring, or as near that size as practicable.
 No wrestling allowed.
 The rounds to be of three minutes' duration, and one minute's time between rounds.
 If either man falls through weakness or otherwise, he must get up unassisted, the boxer has 10 seconds to allow him to do so, the other man meanwhile to return to his corner, and when the fallen man is on his legs the round is to be resumed and continued until the three minutes have expired. If one man fails to come to the scratch in the 10 count allowed, it shall be in the power of the referee to give his award in favour of the other man.
 A man hanging on the ropes in a helpless state, with his toes off the ground, shall be considered down.
 No seconds or any other person to be allowed in the ring during the rounds.
 Should the contest be stopped by any unavoidable interference, the referee to name the time and place as soon as possible for finishing the contest; so that the match must be won and lost, unless the backers of both men agree to draw the stakes.
 The gloves to be fair-sized boxing gloves of the best quality and new.
 Should a glove burst, or come off, it must be replaced to the referee's satisfaction.
 A man on one knee is considered down and if struck is entitled to the stakes.
 That no shoes or boots with spikes or sprigs (wire nails) be allowed.
 The contest in all other respects to be governed by revised London Prize Ring Rules.

Modern rules
Current modern rules per the North American Association of Boxing Commissions are as follows.

Boxing match
A boxing match is contested in three-minute rounds and ends after a pre-determined number (up to 12, formerly 15) have been fought if there is no clear winner. After every round except the last, the fighters return to their assigned corners for one minute and may receive advice and attention from their coaches. The fight is controlled by a referee who works in the ring to judge and control the fight, rule on the ability of the fighters to fight safely, count knocked-down fighters, and rule on fouls.

Win by knockout (KO)
A fighter is considered to be knocked down if they touch the canvas floor of the ring with any body part other than the feet as a direct result of an opponent's punch, rather than a slip or stumble, as determined by the referee. Once a knockdown occurs, the referee begins counting until either he reaches 10 or the fighter returns to their feet and can continue, whichever occurs first. If the referee completes the count, the bout ends and the standing fighter is credited with a win by knockout (KO), whether or not the knocked-down fighter has lost consciousness at any point.

Win by technical knockout (TKO)
A "technical knockout" (TKO) may be ruled by the referee or fight doctor if a fighter is unable to safely continue the bout, based on injuries or an inability to mount an effective defense, or if a fighter declines to continue the bout after the one-minute break between rounds has ended. If a fighter is knocked down three times in one round, the bout ends immediately and the opponent is credited with a win by TKO. A TKO is counted as a knockout in a fighter's record.

Win by decision
There are three judges at ringside to score the fight and assign points to the boxers, based on connecting punches, defense, knockdowns, and other subjective measures such as accuracy of punches landed. The judges do not confer during the fight. Because of the open-ended nature of judging, there have been many controversial rulings.

If the fight goes to the conclusion of the scheduled number of rounds without a knockout or technical knockout, then the scores assigned by the judges are used to determine a winner. The result can be classified as a unanimous decision, majority decision, split decision, or draw based on the judges' assessments.

Standing eight count

A "standing eight count" rule may also be in effect. This gives the referee the right to step in and administer a count of eight to a fighter that he feels may be in danger, even if no knockdown has taken place. After counting the referee will observe the fighter, and decide if he is fit to continue. For scoring purposes, a standing eight count is treated as a knockdown.

Violations
Violations of these boxing rules may be ruled a "foul" by the referee, who may issue warnings, deduct points, or disqualify an offending boxer, causing an automatic loss, depending on the seriousness and intentionality of the foul. An intentional foul that causes injury that prevents a fight from continuing usually causes the boxer who committed it to be disqualified. A fighter who suffers an accidental low-blow may be given up to five minutes to recover, after which they may be ruled knocked out if they are unable to continue. Accidental fouls that cause injury ending a bout may lead to a "no contest" result, or else cause the fight to go to a decision if enough rounds (typically four or more, or at least three in a four-round fight) have passed.

Other rules
Boxers are prohibited from hitting below the belt, holding, tripping, pushing, biting, spitting on or wrestling their opponent. Boxers typically wear shorts or trunks with the waistband raised so the opponent is not allowed to strike the groin area. They also are prohibited from kicking, head-butting, or striking with any part of the arm other than the knuckles of a closed fist. They are prohibited as well from hitting the back, the back of the head/neck (commonly called a "rabbit-punch"), or the kidneys. They are prohibited from holding the ropes for support when punching, holding an opponent while punching, or ducking below the level of the opponent's belt. If a "clinch" – a defensive move in which a fighter wraps his arms around those of the opponent and holds on to create a pause – is broken by the referee, each fighter must take a full step back before punching again. Alternatively, the referee may direct the fighters to "punch out" of the clinch. When a boxer is knocked down, the other boxer must immediately cease fighting and move to the furthest neutral corner of the ring until the referee has either ruled a knockout or called for the fight to continue;  however, once a fighter is knocked down, the referee must count to eight seconds before the fight can continue.

See also
10 Point System

References

Queensbury
Boxing rules and regulations
1867 introductions
History of boxing